Tayanç Ayaydın (born 7 August 1979) is a Turkish actor.

Life and career 
Ayaydın was born in 1979 in Istanbul. He started his education at the Private Doğa College's primary school. He finished his high school education at Tercüman High School and İstek Foundation High School. He eventually graduated from Mimar Sinan University with a degree in theatre studies. He first rose to prominence with his role in the TV series Aliye as Doctor Kahraman. For his role in Ben Hopkins's 2008 movie Pazar-Bir Ticaret Masalı he won the Best Actor award at the Locarno Film Festival. In 2009, he was cast in Sakarya Fırat, in which he portrayed the role of a gendarme official named Osman Kanat. In 2016, he appeared in a recurring role on Kanal D drama series Hayat Şarkısı, playing the character of Hüseyin Cevher. The following year he joined the cast of teen drama Kırgın Çiçekler.

Filmography

Awards 
 2008 Antalya Golden Orange Film Festival - Best Actor (Pazar - Bir Ticaret Masalı)
 2008 Locarno Film Festival - Best Actor (Pazar - Bir Ticaret Masalı)

References

External links 
 
 

1979 births
Best Actor Golden Orange Award winners
Male actors from Istanbul
Turkish male television actors
Turkish male film actors
Turkish male voice actors
Living people